White Abbey is a ruined abbey near the town of Kildare, County Kildare, Ireland.

History
It was founded around 1290 by William de Vesci. It was run by Carmelite friars.
It is described in documentation as 'An Mhainistir Liath'
The monastery was extended towards the south some time later.
Some of the Earls of Kildare are buried there.
Friars expelled and buildings demolished by the agents of King Henry VIII in 1540.
The land was sold to David Sutton Tully in 1543.
The Friars well is located a short distance west of the abbey.
Mounding of the ground indicate the presence of domestic accommodation for the friars.

Religion in County Kildare
Former religious buildings and structures in the Republic of Ireland
Ruins in the Republic of Ireland
13th-century establishments in Ireland
Christian monasteries in the Republic of Ireland
Christian monasteries established in the 13th century